The United States Coast Guard no longer operates four 52-foot Motor Lifeboats (MLBs), which supplement its fleet of 227 47-foot Motor Lifeboats.
These vessels were built in the late 1950s and early 1960s, and displace 32 tons.
The four vessels are all stationed in the Pacific Northwest.

Design and history
After World War II, reduced budgets meant the Coast Guard continued to use its two existing wooden 52' MLBs, also known as the Type F lifeboats, Invincible and Triumph. By the late 1950s, the wooden MLBs were starting to wear out and the Coast Guard built a set of steel 52' MLBs at Curtis Bay Yard to replace them, specifically designed for the high surf conditions encountered along the Pacific Northwest coast. The steel 52' MLBs feature an aluminum superstructure and a hull divided into seven watertight compartments; because of their relatively high cost of  each, only four were built. After entering service, the steering/rudder system was modified by removing the rudder guard, shortening the bilge keels, installing twin rudders, and adding a hydraulic power assist to the steering.

To increase their endurance and capabilities, the 52' MLB is equipped with a complete galley and a fire/salvage pump with  capacity.

On October 1, 2020, the fleet was placed on restricted status due to maintenance and safety concerns. In November 2021, all 4 boats were towed to Coast Guard Station Cape Disappointment and laid-up pending a decision on their future disposition.

Vessels

Notes

See also
 36-foot Motor Lifeboat
 44-foot Motor Lifeboat
 47-foot Motor Lifeboat

References

Bibliography

Individual boats

External links

 
 
 

Motor Lifeboat
Motor lifeboats of the United States
Ships built by the United States Coast Guard Yard